The Swayze greenstone belt is a late Archean greenstone belt in northern Ontario, Canada. It is the southwestern extension of the Abitibi greenstone belt.

See also
Volcanism of Canada
Volcanism of Eastern Canada
List of volcanoes in Canada
List of greenstone belts

References

Volcanism of Ontario
Greenstone belts
Archean volcanism